Vauquelinia, commonly known as the rosewoods, is a genus of the rose family, Rosaceae. It consists of two species of shrubs found in the southwestern United States and northwestern Mexico. The genus was named for French chemist Louis Nicolas Vauquelin (1763-1829). The nectar provided by these plants is commonly fed on by wasps such as Polistes instabilis.

V. californica is of some interest as an ornamental.

Taxonomy
Vauquelinia, along with Lindleya and Kageneckia were formerly placed in family Quillajaceae, and have dry dehiscent fruit. Unlike the pome-fruited members of tribe Maleae within the Rosaceae, which share a base chromosome number of 17 with  Lindleya and Kageneckia, Vauquelinia has a base chromosome number of 15.

Species
, four species and some subspecies were recognized:
Vauquelinia angustifolia Rydb.
Vauquelinia australis Standl.
Vauquelinia californica (Torr.) Sarg. — Arizona rosewood
Vauquelinia californica ssp. californica
Vauquelinia californica ssp. pauciflora (Standl.) Hess & Henrickson
Vauquelinia corymbosa Humb. & Bonpl. — slimleaf rosewood
Vauquelinia corymbosa ssp. angustifolia (Rydb.) Hess & Henrickson
Vauquelinia corymbosa ssp. corymbosa

References

 
Taxa named by Aimé Bonpland
Rosaceae genera